Draco is a genus of agamid lizards that are also known as flying lizards, flying dragons or gliding lizards. These lizards are capable of gliding flight via membranes that may be extended to create wings (patagia), formed by an enlarged set of ribs.  They are arboreal insectivores.

While not capable of powered flight they often obtain lift in the course of their gliding flights. They are found across Southeast Asia and southern India and are fairly common in forests, areca gardens, teak plantations and shrub jungle.

History of discovery
Carl Linnaeus described the genus in 1758, with the type species being Draco volans. The name of the genus is from the Latin term for mythological dragons. In the early and mid 20th century, there was controversy about their gliding capabilities, with some authors suggesting that the patagia were solely for display, but research in the late 1950s firmly established the gliding function of the patagia.

Gliding

The lizards are well known for their "display structures" and ability to glide long distances using their wing-like, patagial membranes supported by elongated thoracic ribs to generate lift forces. The hindlimbs in cross section form a streamlined and contoured airfoil, and are also probably involved in generating lift.  Gliding is both used to escape predators, and as the primary means of moving through their forest habitat. The folding and unfolding of the membrane is controlled by the iliocostalis and intercostal muscles, that in other lizards are used to control breathing. At takeoff, the lizard jumps and descends headfirst, orientating itself so that the underside of the body is parallel to the ground. During flight, the back arches, forming the patagium into a cambered surface, and the forelimbs grab the front of the patagium, forming a straight front edge to the aerofoil. The forelimbs are used to manipulate the patagium in order to adjust the trajectory during flight. Maximum gliding speeds have been found to be between 5.2 and 7.6 metres per second, depending on the species. During the landing process, the glide is mostly horizontal. Immediately before landing, the forelimbs release the patagium. The landing is forefeet-first, followed by hindfeet. The shape of the gliding membrane does not correlate with body size, meaning the larger species have proportionately less lift-generating surface area and consequently higher wing loading.

Habitat and ecology 
Members of Draco are primarily arboreal, inhabiting tropical rainforests, and are almost never found on the forest floor. They are insectivorous, primarily feeding on ants and termites. The colour of the patagium is strongly correlated to the colour of the local falling leaves, likely as camouflage against predatory birds.

Social behaviour and reproduction
Draco lizards are highly territorial, with the home range consisting of one or a few trees. The trees are actively guarded by males, with territory-less males searching the forest landscape in search of vacant areas. Experimental studies have determined that suitable unoccupied territories were claimed within a few hours of the removal of a dominant male. Females move freely through the territories. The patagium is used as a display structure during courtship and territorial disputes between rival males, alongside the opening of a colourful dewlap. The dewlap is translucent, and deliberately orientated perpendicular to the orientation of the sun during display in order to enhance visibility. Draco is sexually dimorphic, with females being larger than males. The only time a female flying lizard ventures to the ground is when she is ready to lay her eggs. She descends the tree she is on and makes a nest hole by forcing her head into the soil. She then lays 2–5 eggs before filling the hole and guards the eggs for approximately 24 hours, but then leaves and has nothing more to do with her offspring.

Distribution 
Species of Draco are widely distributed in the forests of Southeast Asia, and one species, Draco dussumieri, inhabits Southern India.

Phylogenetics 
Within Agamidae, Draco is a member of the subfamily Draconinae. Within Draconinae, Draco is most closely related to the genera Japalura and Ptyctolaemus.

Species 

The following 41 species are recognized:

 Draco abbreviatus  – Singapore flying dragon
 Draco beccarii 
 Draco biaro  – Lazell's flying dragon
 Draco bimaculatus  – two-spotted flying lizard
 Draco blanfordii  – Blanford's flying dragon, Blandford’s flying lizard, Blanford's gliding lizard
 Draco boschmai 
 Draco caerulhians 
 Draco cornutus 
 Draco cristatellus  – crested flying dragon
 Draco cyanopterus 
 Draco dussumieri  – Indian flying lizard, Western Ghats flying lizard, southern flying lizard
 Draco fimbriatus  – fringed flying dragon, crested gliding lizard
 Draco formosus  – dusky gliding lizard
 Draco guentheri  – Günther's flying lizard, Guenther's flying lizard
 Draco haematopogon  – red-bearded flying dragon, yellow-bearded gliding lizard
 Draco indochinensis  – Indochinese flying lizard, Indochinese gliding lizard
 Draco iskandari 
 Draco jareckii 
 Draco lineatus  – lined flying dragon
 Draco maculatus  – spotted flying dragon
 Draco maximus  – great flying dragon, giant gliding lizard
 Draco melanopogon  – black-bearded gliding lizard, black-barbed flying dragon
 Draco mindanensis  – Mindanao flying dragon, Mindanao flying lizard
 Draco modiglianii  – lined flying dragon
 Draco norvillii  – Norvill's flying lizard
 Draco obscurus  – dusky gliding lizard
 Draco ornatus  – white-spotted flying lizard
 Draco palawanensis 
 Draco punctatus  – punctate flying dragon
 Draco quadrasi  – Quadras's flying lizard
 Draco quinquefasciatus  – five-lined flying dragon, five-banded gliding lizard
 Draco reticulatus 
 Draco rhytisma 
 Draco spilonotus  – Sulawesi lined gliding lizard
 Draco spilopterus  – Philippine flying dragon
 Draco sumatranus  – common gliding lizard
 Draco supriatnai 
 Draco taeniopterus  – Thai flying dragon, barred flying dragon, barred gliding lizard
 Draco timoriensis  – Timor flying dragon
 Draco volans  – common flying dragon
 Draco walkeri 

Nota bene: a binomial authority in parentheses indicates that the species was originally described in a genus other than Draco.

Prehistoric analogues 
Several other lineages of reptile known from the fossil record have convergently evolved similar gliding mechanisms, the oldest of these being the weigeltisaurids, known from the Late Permian, around 258 to 252 million years ago. Other lineages include the Triassic kuehneosaurids and Mecistotrachelos, and the Cretaceous lizard Xianglong.

See also
 Flying and gliding animals
 Chrysopelea gliding snake

References

Further reading

 Goin CJ, Goin OB, Zug GR (1978). Introduction to Herpetology, Third Edition. San Francisco: W.H. Freeman & Company. xi + 378 pp. . (Genus Draco, pp. 41, 86, 112, 279, 288).
  33 pp.
 Linnaeus C (1758). Systema naturæ per regna tria naturæ, secundum classes, ordines, genera, species, cum characteribus, differentiis, synonymis, locis. Tomus I. Editio Decima, Reformata. Stockholm: L. Salvius. 824 pp. (Genus Draco, p. 199).
 

Draco
Lizard genera
Gliding animals
Taxa named by Carl Linnaeus